Archduchess Maria Theresa of Austria (20 March 176223 January 1770) was a daughter of Joseph II, Holy Roman Emperor, and his first wife, Isabella of Parma.

Life

Maria Theresa's parents, Crown Prince Joseph and Princess Isabella of Parma, were married in Vienna on 16 October 1760. In late 1761, Isabella became pregnant and on 20 March 1762, she delivered a daughter who was christened Maria Theresia Elisabeth Philippine Louise Josephe Johanna and was styled Archduchess of Austria. On her maternal side, little Maria Theresa descended from people such as the first Bourbon King of Spain, Philip V of Spain. On her paternal side, she descended from the famous Maria Theresa and her husband, Francis I, Holy Roman Emperor. Her ancestors could be traced to as far as Charles I Magnus, a ninth-century Holy Roman Emperor. 

When the little archduchess was a little over a year old, her mother died a week after giving birth to Archduchess Marie Christine, who died a few moments after being born. Her father was inconsolable and found refuge in his infant daughter, whom he referred to as his "second self". Maria Theresa was also close to her youngest paternal aunt, Archduchess Maria Antonia, just seven years her senior. She was Empress Maria Theresa's first grandchild.

Death
Just a few months short of her eighth birthday, Archduchess Maria Theresa became ill with pleurisy. Her father, by that time Holy Roman Emperor, did everything in his power to save her and attended her bedside even at night. Archduchess Maria Theresa died on 23 January 1770 from a very high fever. Her father was heartbroken. When Khevenhüller had to disturb Joseph in order to make the arrangements for the funeral, the emperor, with tears in his eyes, told him 'he had lost, so to speak, his only consolation and pleasure'.

Below are excerpts from a letter from Joseph to his daughter's governess, the marquise d'Herzelles, written a few hours after the child's death;

The death of his only and much-idolized daughter confirmed Joseph in his growing misanthropy, and finished the job of making him a compulsive worker.

The little Archduchess was the second of Maria Theresa's grandchildren to die, after her younger sister. It is said that, even after her death, her father kept her dresses and shoes. She was buried in the Imperial Crypt in Vienna. Her tomb consists of an effigy that represents the young Archduchess sleeping on a bed, covered by a blanket, with her hands towards the sky in sign of prayer and surrounded by the Holy Crown of Hungary and the crown of the Holy Roman Emperor.

Ancestors

References

1762 births
1770 deaths
Burials at the Imperial Crypt
House of Habsburg
Austrian princesses
Daughters of emperors
Royalty and nobility who died as children
Daughters of kings